Bhai Mansukh was a devout Sikh and a trader from Lahore region  and was disciple of the Guru Nanak. He embraced Sikh faith in company of Bhai Bhagirath (Nambardar of Mailsihan, Shahkot, who Durga worshipper, converted to Sikh faith by Baba Nanak).

Mansukh preached Sikh thought around South India and Sri Lanka. Under influence of Mansukh King Shivnabh of Sangladeep accepted Sikh thought. He told Shivnabh about Guru Nanak being on religious travels and will visit Sri Lanka region.

See also
 Labana Sikh

References

Indian Sikhs
People from Lahore
Labana